S-18986 is a positive allosteric modulator of the AMPA receptor related to cyclothiazide. It has nootropic and neuroprotective effects in animal studies, and induces both production of BDNF and AMPA-mediated release of noradrenaline and acetylcholine in the hippocampus and frontal cortex of the brain.

See also
 AMPA receptor positive allosteric modulator

References

AMPA receptor positive allosteric modulators
Benzothiadiazines
Experimental drugs